Jerry Lewis (1926–2017) was an American comedian, actor, film director, screenwriter, and telethon host.

Jerry Lewis may also refer to:

People
Jerry Lewis (Arizona politician) (born 1956), Arizona State Senator
Jerry Lewis (California politician) (1934–2021), U.S. Representative from California's 41st congressional district
Gerald A. Lewis (1934–2022), known as Jerry, American politician, comptroller of the State of Florida (1975–1995)
Jerry Lee Lewis (1935–2022), American musician, early rock and roll artist famed for Great Balls of Fire

Fictional characters
 Jerry Lewis, a character in the cartoon television series Totally Spies!

See also

 
 
 Lewis (surname)
 Jerry (given name)
 Gary Lewis (disambiguation)
 Lewis (disambiguation)
 Jerry (disambiguation)
 Gerry (disambiguation)